George Keymas (November 18, 1925 – January 17, 2008) was an American film and television actor.

Career

Keymas graduated from Springfield (Ohio) High School.

Keymas began his Hollywood career in 1950, mainly in Westerns. His first screen appearance was in an uncredited role in the 1950 B-feature film, I Shot Billy the Kid, with lead Don "Red" Barry. Due to his rugged looks, Keymas was cast in ethnic, often Native-American characters, or cow-punching, at times ruthless, cowboys, in countless film/TV westerns.

His most recognizable role was as "The Leader" in the classic TV The Twilight Zone episode "Eye of the Beholder", which originally aired November 11, 1960. His freakish ambiguous character was seen throughout the episode on a futuristic big-screen monitor as background sub-plot to the story. In 1962, he played a murderer in "The Nancy Davis Story" on the TV Western Wagon Train (S5, E33).

Keymas's ‘Indian’ roles came in many other popular TV westerns series of the day such as: Daniel Boone, “Death Valley Days”, The High Chaparral, Gunsmoke, and Bonanza among many others. Keymas retired in 1977.

Selected filmography

 I Shot Billy the Kid (1950) - Murphy's Man (uncredited)
 Border Rangers (1950) - Raker - Henchman
 Mask of the Avenger (1951) - Austrian Soldier (uncredited)
 Actors and Sin (1952) - Producer (segment "Woman of Sin")
 The Miracle of Our Lady of Fatima (1952) - Prisoner (uncredited)
 Salome (1953) - Sailor (uncredited)
 Siren of Bagdad (1953) - Soradin
 Flame of Calcutta (1953) - Prince Jehan
 The Robe (1953) - Slave (uncredited)
 The Great Adventures of Captain Kidd (1953, Serial) - Sailor in the Argus brig (uncredited)
 King of the Khyber Rifles (1953) - Afridi Horseman (uncredited)
 Bait (1954) - Chuck
 Drums of Tahiti (1954) - Angelo
 The Raid (1954) - Captain Dupree (uncredited)
 The Black Dakotas (1954) - Spotted Deer (uncredited)
 They Rode West (1954) - Torquay (uncredited)
 The Bamboo Prison (1954) - Spiros Metaxas (uncredited)
 The Prodigal (1955) - Scribe (uncredited)
 Stranger on Horseback (1955) - Bannerman's Henchman
 Wyoming Renegades (1955) - George Curry
 Kentucky Rifle (1955) - Interpreter
 Santa Fe Passage (1955) - Chief Satank
 Apache Ambush (1955) - Tweedy
 The Vanishing American (1955) - Coshanta
 Kismet (1955) - Young Policeman (uncredited)
 Fury at Gunsight Pass (1956) - Daley
 The Maverick Queen (1956) - Muncie
 Walk the Proud Land (1956) - Ponce (uncredited)
 Thunder Over Arizona (1956) - Harvard 'Shotgun' Kelly
 The White Squaw (1956) - Yotah
 Utah Blaine (1957) - Rink Witter
 The Storm Rider (1957) - Apache Kid
 Apache Warrior (1957) - Chato
 Plunder Road (1957) - Officer No. 1 (uncredited)
 Gunfire at Indian Gap (1957) - Scully
 Cole Younger, Gunfighter (1958) - Sgt. Price - State Police
 Gunsmoke in Tucson (1958) - Hondo
 Studs Lonigan (1960) - Gangster (uncredited)
 Lonely Are the Brave (1962) - Deputy (uncredited)
 He Rides Tall (1964) - Ed Harney (uncredited)
 Arizona Raiders (1965) - Montana
 Beau Geste (1966) - Platoon Sergeant
 Journey to Shiloh (1968) - Crooked Gambler (uncredited)
 The Other Side of Midnight (1977) - Dr. K

References

Bibliography
 Martin, Len. The Republic Pictures Checklist: Features, Serials, Cartoons, Short Subjects and Training Films of Republic Pictures Corporation, 1935-1959. McFarland.

External links

1925 births
2008 deaths
American male film actors
American male television actors
Western (genre) television actors
20th-century American male actors